Manderino is a surname. Notable people with the surname include:

Chris Manderino (born 1982), American football player
James J. Manderino (1932–1989), American politician
Joey Manderino, American television writer and producer
Kathy Manderino (born 1958), American politician